Jacek Kazimierski (born 17 August 1959 in Warsaw) is a Polish former professional footballer who played as a goalkeeper.

He began his career in Agrykola Warsaw and later played for Legia Warsaw, Olympiacos and K.A.A. Gent. He won the Polish Cup twice in 1980 and 1981 with Legia Warsaw and appeared in 225 Polish league games. He also won the Greek Super Cup with Olympiacos in 1988.

He represented the Poland national team (23 matches) and participated at the 1982 and 1986 FIFA World cups, winning a bronze medal in 1982.

International

References

1959 births
Living people
Polish footballers
Association football goalkeepers
Poland youth international footballers
Poland international footballers
1982 FIFA World Cup players
1986 FIFA World Cup players
Ekstraklasa players
Super League Greece players
Belgian Pro League players
Legia Warsaw players
Olympiacos F.C. players
K.A.A. Gent players
Polish expatriate footballers
Polish expatriate sportspeople in Greece
Expatriate footballers in Greece
Polish expatriate sportspeople in Belgium
Expatriate footballers in Belgium
Footballers from Warsaw